Achok Majak is an American fashion model.

Early life 
Majak was born in Santa Barbara, California. She is of South Sudanese descent.

Career 
Majak has appeared in campaigns for Tiffany & Co., (along with models Vittoria Ceretti, Julia Nobis, and Georgina Grenville) Gucci, Revlon, Marc Jacobs, and Balenciaga. She has walked the runway for brands such as Gucci, Marc Jacobs, Max Mara, Zac Posen, Acne Studios, Miu Miu, Vionnet, Rick Owens, Emilio Pucci, and Belstaff. She has appeared in editorials for Elle, i-D, Vogue Italia, WSJ, CR Fashion Book, and Love.

In 2020, Majak made her feature film debut as an actress in the horror film Antebellum (2020).

References 

Living people
Female models from California
American people of South Sudanese descent
African-American female models
21st-century American women
21st-century African-American people
1992 births
21st-century African-American women
People from Santa Barbara, California